Albin Martin (c.1813 – 7 August 1888) was a New Zealand artist, farmer and politician. He was born in Stower Provost, Dorset, England, in c. 1813.

References

1813 births
1888 deaths
New Zealand artists
New Zealand farmers
English emigrants to New Zealand
19th-century New Zealand politicians